Gʻozgʻon is a district-level city in Navoiy Region, Uzbekistan. The town population in 1989 was 4,728 people.

References

Populated places in Navoiy Region
Cities in Uzbekistan